Olga Pikhienko (born February 11, 1980) is a circus performer who specializes in handbalancing and contortion. Pikhienko started in rhythmic gymnastics at the age of five. When she was eleven, she started performing with her father, Sasha Pikhienko, at the Nikulin Circus based in Moscow. Olga's act with her father won them a gold medal in 1992 at the Festival Mondial du Cirque de Demain in Paris. In 1993, they won a silver medal in Beijing, China at the World Festival.

Pikhienko started working with Cirque du Soleil in 1994. In 1996, she went on tour with Cirque du Soleil's production Quidam, and, for more than five years, performed her hand balancing and contortion with canes act throughout Europe and North America. In 2001, she worked on the creation of Varekai, while being filmed for the Bravo network's documentary series Cirque du Soleil: Fire Within, which won an Emmy Award in 2003.

After touring with Varekai for three years, Pikhienko decided to branch out artistically, developing new acts for special events, commercials, print and video. Her new act was choreographed by Debra Brown, who has choreographed for many Cirque du Soleil shows. She returned to Quidam in 2006, and toured with the show once again until she went back to the Cirque du Soleil headquarters for the creation of Iris, her third show with the company. The show premiered in July 2011. According to her personal Facebook page, she left Iris on September 2, 2012. After that, she performed briefly in a show called Le Noir: the Dark Side of Cirque, and also Empire, a show touring in Australia. She has returned to doing private events and resides in Las Vegas, Nevada with her family.

History 
 1985-1990: Rhythmic gymnastics (Russia)
 1991-1992: Nikulin Circus (Moscow): hand-to-hand contortion with Alexander Pikhienko
 1993-1994: Ringling Bros. and Barnum & Bailey Circus: hand-to-hand contortion with Alexander Pikhienko
 1994-2000: Cirque du Soleil's Quidam, North American Tour and European Tour: hand balancing and contortion with canes
 2000-2003: Cirque du Soleil's Varekai, North American Tour: hand balancing and contortion with canes, principal character
 2003-2006: Independent artist — special events, television, film, print: hand balancing and contortion with canes
 2006–2011: Cirque du Soleil's Quidam, North and South American tour
 2011–2012: Cirque du Soleil's Iris in Hollywood
 2012: Le Noir: The Dark Side of Cirque
 2012-2013 Empire, Australian tour
 2013–present: Independent artist - special events, television, film, print: hand balancing and contortion with canes

Film and television
 Cirque du Soleil — Quidam
 Cirque du Soleil — Varekai
 Cirque du Soleil — Cirque du Soleil: Fire Within

References

External links

Russian circus performers
Contortionists
Living people
Russian rhythmic gymnasts
Cirque du Soleil performers
1980 births
Sportspeople from Volgograd